Sabarmati Riverfront is a waterfront being developed along the banks of Sabarmati river in Ahmedabad, India. Proposed in the 1960s, the construction began in 2005. Since 2012, the waterfront is gradually opened to public as and when facilities are constructed and various facilities are actively under construction. The major objectives of project are environment improvement, social infrastructure and sustainable development.

Geography

The Dharoi Dam constructed in 1976 upstream of Ahmedabad controls water and protects from flooding while Vasna Barrage constructed in 1976 downstream retains water in the river along the city banks and diverts it through Fatehwadi canal for irrigation. The Narmada Canal, which crosses Sabarmati a few kilometres upstream from the city, is part of a larger canal network of Sardar Sarovar Dam. The canal can feed excess water to the river and maintains the level of water in the river which is retained through Vasna Barrage.

History

The first proposal for developing the riverfront was presented in 1961 by the prominent citizens of the city. French architect Bernard Kohn proposed an ecological valley in Sabarmati basin stretched from Dharoi Dam to Gulf of Cambay in the 1960s. In 1964, he proposed an Integrated Planning and Development of Sabarmati Riverfront by reclaiming  of land. The project was considered feasible in 1966 by the Government of Gujarat. Later he distanced himself from the project citing the difference between his proposal and the project being implemented. In 1976, the Riverfront Development Group proposed an incremental approach for the construction. In 1992, the National River Conservation Plan proposed construction of sewers and pumping stations to reduce water pollution.

Environmental Planning Collaborative (EPC) led by Bimal Patel prepared the feasibility report in 1998. Initially the proposal was to construct the riverfront to cover a stretch of  stretch from Subhash bridge to Vasna barrage and to reclaim  of the riverbed. The project estimated to cost   which was to be recovered by selling of a part of reclaimed land for commercial and residential purpose. Bimal Patel-led HCP Design, Planning and Management Pvt. Ltd, Ahmedabad was roped in as the main architect of the project. The project  encountered several delays due to concerns regarding water level, flooding, rehabilitation of displaced slum dwellers and the opposition from the activists involved with slum rehabilitation.

The construction began in 2005. It was inaugurated by then state Chief Minister Narendra Modi. The waterfront is gradually opened to public as and when facilities are finished. Various facilities are actively under construction since then. Total  were spent on the project by 2014.

The Chinese leader, Xi Jinping and his wife Peng Liyuan visited Sabarmati riverfront with prime minister of India Narendra Modi on 17 September, 2014.

Riverfront

It can hold  without spillage. The reclaimed land is used for public as well as private development. More than 85% of the reclaimed land proposed be used for public infrastructure, recreational parks, sports facilities and gardens while nearly 14% proposed be used for commercial and residential purpose.

It improves environment by reducing erosion of the banks and flooding of low-lying areas of the city by the walls constructed on the both banks. The new integrated sewage and storm-water system intercepts 38 former sewage and industrial effluent discharge points and route it to sewage treatment plants south of Vasna Barrage. 

It enabled the groundwater recharge and the recreational facilities like boating in the river. There are also plans to replenish river by treated sewage water.

Streets
The roads along the both banks are constructed for the easy movement of traffic along north-south direction. They are constructed with footpaths, parking bays, carriage ways and cycle tracks. The roads leading to river are strengthened for better movement and access. The West River Drive decongestants the Ashram Road and has  RoW. The East River Drive provides better north-south access to east part of the city and direct road to airport. It has  RoW.

Recreation and amenities

Amenities

The two-level promenade is planned and the lower promenade is already constructed. The width of the promenade varies from 6 to 18 metres. The 31 Ghats are constructed at regular interval along the lower promenade for access to the water. The boating stations are constructed for recreational purpose and for water-based public transport in the future. Three such stations are open.

The  Events Ground is an event ground with infrastructure facilities. It serves as open venue for variety of purpose and revenue source for the project. The  laundry campus with seven blocks opened in February 2014. It has washing areas on the ground level and drying facilities on the terraces. Fourteen public utilities are constructed.

The Sabarmati Ashram will be also connected to lower promenade and existing steps will be developed as an amphitheater. The 3.3 ha Heritage Plaza along the city walls between Ellis Bridge and Nehru Bridge will be designed as open space showcasing heritage, history and culture of the city. Some sports complexes are also proposed.

Atal Pedestrian Bridge connects both banks of the river.

Parks and gardens

Nearly 26% of the reclaimed land will be used for the parks and gardens to enhance environment and for public recreation. Some parks are already constructed and expanded while others are under construction and proposed. 

It is spread over an area of 60,000 sq m, has of a lotus lake, amphitheatre, stepwell and 2-km long walkway. It was opened in October 2013. The 1.8 ha park near Usmanpura were opened in October 2013. The 5 ha Riverfront Flower Park, spread over 45,000 sq m, houses 330 native and exotic flower species. The children's park near Dafnala is opened in 2019. 

The 10.4 ha urban forest is built in Paldi which is divided in two parts by Ambedkar Bridge. The north part serves as garden while the south part is a biodiversity park. It will cost . The Riverfront Biodiversity Park, spread over two hectares land, houses around 7000 trees of over 120 species and 35 species of native as well as migratory birds such as boot-headed eagle, egrets, ibis, white-throated kingfisher, purple swamphen and sparrows. Some species of butterflies and snakes are also there. The SRFDL used the Miyawaki method of plantation with five saplings per square metre of land. It planted around 70,000 saplings on land between Ambedkar bridge and Sport Club.

The 0.9 ha amusement park is also proposed near Dadhichi bridge. The 1.4 ha Peace Garden at Khanpur is proposed as a park as well as location for concerts and outdoor performances.

Markets
Several markets, vending areas, business and event grounds are planned. Ravivari or Gujari Bazar, the informal Sunday Market held under Ellis Bridge is moved to the new location near Gaekwad Haveli. The open air market has function arrangement of zones and 1641 platforms for vendors. It was opened to the public in February 2014. The 5.7 ha Exhibition Centre, a trade-fair facility, is proposed on the eastern bank of the river. The 0.5 ha plaza at Vallabhsadan is also proposed as a market along upper promenade.

Sports complexes
Three sports complexes are proposed; at Paldi (7.1 ha) for city-level sports, at Pirana (4.2 ha) for informal sports and at Shahpur (2.3 ha).

Residential and commercial development
It is planned to use nearly 14% of the reclaimed land for residential and commercial purposes. Total 52 buildings will be constructed including eight museums. For maximum usage of land, the floor space index (FSI) has been raised up to 5. The funds raised by selling the land will recover the cost of the construction and sustain the management of the riverfront. All construction will have to follow certain design guidelines. Four of these 42 proposed buildings will be 101 metres tall. 

In 2017, the SRDFL attempted to sell the development rights of the land but failed. In 2020, the SRFDCL appointed JLL India to monetise around  land which is valued .

Future 
The Phase 2 of the project proposed an extension of the riverfront towards north, 5.4-km on east side and 4.3-km on west side. It also proposed 180 high-rise residential buildings as well as commercial buildings on the reclaimed land. In 2019 state budget, total  was provisioned for Phase 2.

Culture
The riverfront is featured in several Gujarati as well as Bollywood films. It hosts several annual events like Sabarmati Marathon, Sabarmati Cyclothon, flower shows, International Kite Festival and airshows. Its continuous promenade attracts runners and fitness enthusiasts. It also hosts trade shows, exhibitions and private wedding events.

Criticism and controversy
There are also concerns regarding perennial status of the river as it depends on the Narmada canal for water.

The project was delayed several times due to issues regarding relocation and rehabilitation of more than 10000 slum dwellers along the river banks. After petitions by activists, the Gujarat High Court intervened and ordered to stop demolition of slums until proper planning is implemented. The relocation and rehabilitation is completed later and faced criticism of activists for delays. Around 5000 families were relocated.

Recognition and impact
 1999: Prime Minister's Award for excellence in urban planning and design
 2006: Prime Ministers Award for excellence in “Urban Design & Concept” Award - Excellence in “Urban Design and Concept”
 2006: National Safety Council of India - Safety Award (Prashansa Patra)
 2011: Housing and Urban Development Corporation Award (HUDCO) - Innovative Infrastructure Development
 2012: Housing and Urban Development Corporation Award (HUDCO) - Best Practices to Improve the Living Environment
 2014: Construction Industry Development Council (CIDC) Vishwakarma Award - Best Construction Project

Several other cities planned to follow the model for riverfront development including Vadodara, Surat, Pune, Varanasi, Chennai, Noida.

Gallery

See also
 Hooghly Riverfront
 Kolkata Eye
 Law Garden

References

External links 
 Official website of SRFDCL

Economy of Ahmedabad
Redeveloped ports and waterfronts in India
Tourist attractions in Ahmedabad
Waterfronts
Gardens in India
Chief Ministership of Narendra Modi